The term national laboratory may generically refer to any government-operated or -sponsored laboratory.  In the United States, laboratories that have "National Laboratory" in their name include:

United States Department of Energy national laboratories
Frederick National Laboratory for Cancer Research, sponsored by the National Cancer Institute
Galveston National Laboratory, sponsored by the National Institute of Allergy and Infectious Diseases
International Space Station United States National Laboratory, sponsored by NASA
Department of Homeland Security Science and Technology Directorate Office of National Laboratories